Ocean is a residential skyscraper under construction located at 84 The Esplanade, Surfers Paradise, Gold Coast, Australia.

When complete, the 78-storey tower which will include 722 apartments, will be the largest on the Gold Coast. Facilities will include a recreation area with swimming pool, spa, fitness courtyard, and barbecue area, which will be located on the top level of a five-level podium. A residents’ indoor pool will be included on level 32. The three level basement will accommodate 392 parking spaces. At a height of 271 metres (856 ft), it is the second tallest building on the Gold Coast, after Q1.

A development application was lodged with the Gold Coast City Council in December 2017.

An objection against the development was lodged in January 2018. Construction subsequently began in mid 2018, before topping out in late 2021.

Construction

See also

List of tallest buildings on the Gold Coast

References

External links
 Building at The Skyscraper Center database

Proposed skyscrapers in Australia
Skyscrapers on the Gold Coast, Queensland
Residential skyscrapers in Australia
Surfers Paradise, Queensland